The Rio de Janeiro Olympic Training Center (COT) is a sports training facility in Barra da Tijuca, Brazil that opened after the 2016 Summer Olympics. The centre includes six venues used in the 2016 games and facilities created in the Barra Olympic Park footprint. The centre is located at the site of the former Nelson Piquet International Autodrome - Jacarepaguá.

Purpose
Its purpose is to establish infrastructure for the development of Brazilian athletes, including teaching and training, with the help of professionals and scientific education. It is inspired and follows similar projects from other countries such as the Australian Institute of Sport in Canberra, Australia, United States Olympic Training Center  in Colorado Springs, and the English Institute of Sport. The first sports are athletics, boxing, fencing, water sports, gymnastics, wrestling, judo, taekwondo, table tennis, archery, tennis, badminton and weightlifting.

Construction began in 2009 and finished in 2016. Funds were planned to come from the Ministry of Sports, from sponsorship contracts and tax incentives.

Process
Athletes undergo a battery of tests and use the physical and professional structure to support their training. At the end, the athletes and the technical committee return home to continue the training and disseminate knowledge acquired.

Facilities
The Center encompasses eight permanent sport facilities in the Barra da Tijuca region. Two were part of the City of Sports Complex established for the 2007 Pan American Games: the HSBC Arena and the Maria Lenk Aquatic Center. A third venue, the Barra Velodrome was demolished and replaced by the Rio Olympic Velodrome. 

Two indoor arenas are included: Carioca Arenas 1 and 2, an Olympic Tennis Center (a Tennis stadium with 15 ancillary courts) and the Olympic Aquatics Stadium. 

The Olympic Tennis Stadium has a capacity of 8,250 spectatorsl; the Olympic Velodrome hosts 5,000 spectators and the Olympic Aquatics Stadium 18,000 spectators. Arena Carioca 1 (16,000) hosted basketball games, and the Paralympic wheelchair basketball and wheelchair rugby games.  Arena Carioca 2 (10,000) hosted the Olympic judo and wrestling events, and the Paralympic boccia events. Arena Carioca 3 (10,000) hosted the Olympic taekwondo and fencing competitions and the Paralympic judo and wheelchair fencing tournaments. Future Arena (a temporary structure to be re-purposed after the Games) hosted the Olympic handball matches, and the Paralympic goalball matches (12,000).

The venues have infrastructure for services in nutrition, physiotherapy & sports medicine, athlete career support, physiological, biomechanical, psychological and biochemical assessment as well as lecture halls and seminar rooms.

References

External links
Parque Olímpic0 (Olympic Park - Barra cluster)
HSBC Arena website 
Parque Aquático Maria Lenk 
Venues of the 2016 Summer Olympics on Google Maps

Sports venues in Rio de Janeiro (city)